The term New Atheism was coined by the American journalist Gary Wolf in 2006 to describe the positions of some atheist academics, writers, scientists, and philosophers of the 21st century.

New Atheism advocates the view that superstition, religion, and irrationalism should not simply be tolerated. Instead, they should be criticised, countered, examined, and challenged by rational argument, especially when they exert strong influence on the broader society, such as in government, education, and politics. Major figures of New Atheism include Richard Dawkins, Sam Harris, Christopher Hitchens, Daniel Dennett, and Ayaan Hirsi Ali.

Proponents of New Atheism often criticised what writers such as Dawkins described as the indoctrination of children and the social harms caused by perpetuating ideologies founded on belief in the supernatural. Critics of the movement described it as militant atheism and fundamentalist atheism.

History
The secular humanist Paul Kurtz, founder of the Center for Inquiry, is often regarded as a forerunner to the New Atheism movement.

The 2004 publication of The End of Faith: Religion, Terror, and the Future of Reason by Sam Harris, a bestseller in the United States, was joined over the next couple years by a series of popular best-sellers by atheist authors. Harris was motivated by the events of 11 September 2001, for which he blamed Islam, while also directly criticizing Christianity and Judaism. Two years later, Harris followed up with Letter to a Christian Nation, which was a severe criticism of Christianity. Also in 2006, following his television documentary series The Root of All Evil?, Richard Dawkins published The God Delusion, which was on the New York Times best-seller list for 51 weeks.

In 2010, Tom Flynn, then editor of Free Inquiry, stated that the only thing new about "New Atheism" was the wider publication of atheist material by big-name publishers, books that appeared on bestseller lists and were read by millions. Mitchell Landsberg, covering a gathering held by the Council for Secular Humanism in 2010, said that religious skeptics in attendance were at odds between "new atheists" who preferred to "encourage open confrontation with the devout" and "acomodationists" who preferred "a subtler, more tactical approach." Paul Kurtz was ousted from the Center for Inquiry in the late 2000's. This was in part due to a perception that Kurtz was "on the mellower end of the spectrum", according to Flynn.

In November 2015, The New Republic published an article entitled, "Is the New Atheism dead?" The atheist and evolutionary biologist David Sloan Wilson wrote in 2016, "The world appears to be tiring of the New Atheism movement." In 2017, PZ Myers who formerly considered himself a new atheist, publicly renounced the New Atheism movement.

The book The Four Horsemen: The Conversation That Sparked an Atheist Revolution was released in 2019.

Prominent figures
Several key figures associated with the New Atheism movement include Richard Dawkins, Sam Harris, Christopher Hitchens, Daniel Dennett, and Ayaan Hirsi Ali.

"Four Horsemen"

On 30 September 2007, Dawkins, Harris, Hitchens and Dennett met at Hitchens' residence in Washington, D.C., for a private two-hour unmoderated round table discussion. The event was videotaped and titled "The Four Horsemen". During "The God Debate" in 2010 with Hitchens versus Dinesh D'Souza, the group was collectively referred to as the "Four Horsemen of the Non-Apocalypse", an allusion to the biblical Four Horsemen of the Apocalypse from the Book of Revelation. The four have been described as "evangelical atheists".

Harris wrote several bestselling non-fiction books including The End of Faith, Letter to a Christian Nation, The Moral Landscape, and Waking Up, along with two shorter works (initially published as e-books) Free Will and Lying. He is a co-founder of the Reason Project.

Dawkins, the author of The God Delusion, and director of a Channel 4 television documentary titled The Root of All Evil?, is the founder of the Richard Dawkins Foundation for Reason and Science. He wrote: "I don't object to the horseman label, by the way. I'm less keen on 'new atheist': it isn't clear to me how we differ from old atheists."

Hitchens, the author of God Is Not Great, was named among the "Top 100 Public Intellectuals" by Foreign Policy and Prospect magazines. He served on the advisory board of the Secular Coalition for America. In 2010, Hitchens published his memoir Hitch-22 (a nickname provided by close personal friend Salman Rushdie, whom Hitchens always supported during and following The Satanic Verses controversy). Shortly after its publication, he was diagnosed with esophageal cancer, which led to his death in December 2011. Before his death, Hitchens published a collection of essays and articles in his book Arguably; a short edition Mortality was published posthumously in 2012. These publications and numerous public appearances provided Hitchens with a platform to remain an astute atheist during his illness, even speaking specifically on the culture of deathbed conversions and condemning attempts to convert the terminally ill, which he opposed as "bad taste".

Dennett is the author of Darwin's Dangerous Idea, and Breaking the Spell. He has been a vocal supporter of The Clergy Project, an organization that provides support for clergy in the US who no longer believe in God and cannot fully participate in their communities any longer.

"Plus one horse-woman"

Hirsi Ali, originally scheduled to attend the 2007 meeting, later appeared with Dawkins, Dennett, and Harris at the 2012 Global Atheist Convention,  where she was referred to as the "plus one horse-woman" by Dawkins. Robyn Blumner, CEO of the Center for Inquiry, described Hirsi Ali as the "Fifth" horseman.

Hirsi Ali was born in Mogadishu, Somalia, fleeing in 1992 to the Netherlands in order to escape an arranged marriage. She became involved in Dutch politics, rejected faith, and became vocal in opposing Islamic ideology, especially concerning women, as exemplified by her books Infidel and The Caged Virgin.

Hirsi Ali was later involved in the production of the film Submission, for which her friend Theo Van Gogh was murdered with a death threat to Hirsi Ali pinned to his chest. This event resulted in Hirsi Ali's hiding and later emigrating to the United States, where she now resides and remains a prolific critic of Islam. She regularly speaks out against the treatment of women in Islamic doctrine and society and is a proponent of free speech and the freedom to offend.

Others

Others have either self-identified as or been classified by some commentators as New Atheists:

 Dan Barker, author of Godless: How an Evangelical Preacher Became One of America's Leading Atheists
 Peter Boghossian, philosopher and author of A Manual for Creating Atheists
 Greta Christina, author of Why Are You Atheists So Angry?: 99 Things that Piss Off the Godless
 Jerry Coyne, author of Faith Versus Fact: Why Science and Religion Are Incompatible
 Rebecca Goldstein, philosopher and author of 36 Arguments for the Existence of God
 Michel Onfray, author of Atheist Manifesto: The Case Against Christianity, Judaism, and Islam
 Victor J. Stenger, author of God: The Failed Hypothesis / How Science Shows That God Does Not Exist

Some writers sometimes classified as New Atheists by others have explicitly distanced themselves from the label:

 A. C. Grayling, philosopher and author of The God Argument
 John W. Loftus
 P. Z. Myers

Perspective
Many contemporary atheists write from a scientific perspective. Unlike previous writers, many of whom thought that science was indifferent or even incapable of dealing with the "God" concept, Dawkins argues to the contrary, claiming the "God Hypothesis" is a valid scientific hypothesis, having effects in the physical universe, and like any other hypothesis can be tested and falsified. Victor Stenger proposed that the personal Abrahamic God is a scientific hypothesis that can be tested by standard methods of science. Both Dawkins and Stenger conclude that the hypothesis fails any such tests, and argue that naturalism is sufficient to explain everything we observe. Nowhere, they argue, is it necessary to introduce God or the supernatural to understand reality.

Scientific testing of religion
Non-believers (in religion and the supernatural) assert that many religious or supernatural claims (such as the virgin birth of Jesus and the afterlife) are scientific claims in nature. For instance, they argue, as do deists and Progressive Christians, that the issue of Jesus' supposed parentage is a question of scientific inquiry, rather than "values" or "morals". Rational thinkers believe science is capable of investigating at least some, if not all, supernatural claims. Institutions such as the Mayo Clinic and Duke University have conducted studies to try to identify whether there is empirical evidence of a healing power of intercessory prayer. According to Stenger, the experiments found no evidence that intercessory prayer worked.

Logical arguments
Stenger also argues in his book, God: The Failed Hypothesis, that a God having omniscient, omnibenevolent and omnipotent attributes, which he termed a 3O God, cannot logically exist. A similar series of alleged logical disproofs of the existence of a God with various attributes can be found in Michael Martin and Ricki Monnier's The Impossibility of God, or Theodore M. Drange's article, "Incompatible-Properties Arguments: A Survey".

Views on non-overlapping magisteria
Richard Dawkins has been particularly critical of the conciliatory view that science and religion are not in conflict, noting, for example, that the Abrahamic religions constantly dabble in scientific matters. In a 1998 article published in Free Inquiry magazine and later in his 2006 book The God Delusion, Dawkins expresses disagreement with the view advocated by Stephen Jay Gould that science and religion are two non-overlapping magisteria (NOMA), each existing in a "domain where one form of teaching holds the appropriate tools for meaningful discourse and resolution".

In Gould's proposal, science and religion should be confined to distinct non-overlapping domains: science would be limited to the empirical realm, including theories developed to describe observations, while religion would deal with questions of ultimate meaning and moral value. Dawkins contends that NOMA does not describe empirical facts about the intersection of science and religion: "It is completely unrealistic to claim, as Gould and many others do, that religion keeps itself away from science's turf, restricting itself to morals and values. A universe with a supernatural presence would be a fundamentally and qualitatively different kind of universe from one without. The difference is, inescapably, a scientific difference. Religions make existence claims, and this means scientific claims."

Science and morality

Popularized by Sam Harris is the view that science and thereby currently unknown objective facts may instruct human morality in a globally comparable way. Harris' book The Moral Landscape and accompanying TED Talk How Science can Determine Moral Values propose that human well-being and conversely suffering may be thought of as a landscape with peaks and valleys representing numerous ways to achieve extremes in human experience, and that there are objective states of well-being.

Politics
In the context of international politics, the principles of New Atheism establish no particular stance in and of themselves. New Atheism's key proponents are, states PZ Meyer, "a madly disorganized mob, united only by [their] dislike of the god-thing." That said, the demographic that supports the New Atheism is a markedly homogeneous one; in America (and the Anglo-sphere more generally) this cohort is "more likely to be younger, male and single, to have higher than average levels of income and education, to be less authoritarian, less dogmatic, less prejudiced, less conformist and more tolerant and open-minded on religious issues." Because of this homogeneity among the group, there exists not a formal dynamic but a loose consensus on broad political "efforts, objectives, and strategies." For example, one of the primary aims here is to further reduce the entanglement of church and state, which derives from the "belief that religion is antithetical to liberal values, such as freedom of expression and the separation of public from private life". Additionally, new atheists have engaged in the campaign "to ensure legal and civic equality for atheists", in a world considerably unwelcoming to and distrustful of non-religious 'believers'. Christopher Hitchens may be the new atheist concerned most with religion's incompatibility with contemporary liberal principles, and particularly its imposed limitation on both freedom of speech and freedom of expression. And because New Atheism's proliferation is accredited partly to the September 11 attacks and the ubiquitous, visceral response, Richard Dawkins, among many in his cohort, believes that theism (in this case, Islam) jeopardizes political institutions and national security, and he warns of religion's potency in motivating "people to do terrible things" against international polities.

Criticisms

According to Nature, "Critics of new atheism, as well as many new atheists themselves, contend that in philosophical terms it differs little from earlier historical forms of atheist thought."

Scientism, accusations of evangelicalism and fundamentalism
The theologians Jeffrey Robbins and Christopher Rodkey take issue with what they regard as "the evangelical nature of the New Atheism, which assumes that it has a Good News to share, at all cost, for the ultimate future of humanity by the conversion of as many people as possible." They believe they have found similarities between New Atheism and evangelical Christianity and conclude that the all-consuming nature of both "encourages endless conflict without progress" between both extremities.

Political philosopher John Gray asserts that "New Atheism", humanism, and 'scientism' are extensions of religion, particularly Christianity.

Sociologist William Stahl said, "What is striking about the current debate is the frequency with which the New Atheists are portrayed as mirror images of religious fundamentalists."

The atheist philosopher of science Michael Ruse has made the claim that Richard Dawkins would fail "introductory" courses on the study of "philosophy or religion" (such as courses on the philosophy of religion), courses which are offered, for example, at many educational institutions such as colleges and universities around the world. Ruse also claims that the movement of New Atheism—which is perceived, by him, to be a "bloody disaster"—makes him ashamed, as a professional philosopher of science, to be among those holding to an atheist position, particularly as New Atheism does science a "grave disservice" and does a "disservice to scholarship" at a more general level.

Paul Kurtz, editor in chief of Free Inquiry, founder of Prometheus Books, was critical of many of the new atheists. He said, "I consider them atheist fundamentalists... They're anti-religious, and they're mean-spirited, unfortunately. Now, there are very good atheists and very dedicated people who do not believe in God. But you have this aggressive and militant phase of atheism, and that does more damage than good".

Jonathan Sacks, author of The Great Partnership: Science, Religion, and the Search for Meaning, feels the new atheists miss the target by believing the "cure for bad religion is no religion, as opposed to good religion". He wrote:

The philosopher Massimo Pigliucci contends that the new atheist movement overlaps with scientism, which he finds to be philosophically unsound. He writes: "What I do object to is the tendency, found among many New Atheists, to expand the definition of science to pretty much encompassing anything that deals with 'facts', loosely conceived..., it seems clear to me that most of the New Atheists (except for the professional philosophers among them) pontificate about philosophy very likely without having read a single professional paper in that field.... I would actually go so far as to charge many of the leaders of the New Atheism movement (and, by implication, a good number of their followers) with anti-intellectualism, one mark of which is a lack of respect for the proper significance, value, and methods of another field of intellectual endeavor."

In The Evolution of Atheism, Stephen LeDrew wrote that New Atheism is fundamentalist and scientist; in contrast to atheism's tradition of social justice, it is right-wing and serves to defend "the position of the white middle-class western male".

Atheist professor Jacques Berlinerblau has criticised the New Atheists' mocking of religion as being inimical to their goals and claims that they have not achieved anything politically.

Roger Scruton has extensively criticized New Atheism on various occasions, generally on the grounds that they do not consider the social effects and impacts of religion in enough detail. He has said, "Look at the facts in the round and it seems likely that humans without a sense of the sacred would have died out long ago. For that same reason, the hope of the new atheists for a world without religion is probably as vain as the hope for a society without aggression or a world without death." He has also complained of the New Atheists' idea that they must "set people free from religion", calling it "naive" because they "never consider that they might be taking something away from people."

Criticisms of responses to theistic arguments
Edward Feser has critiqued the New Atheists' responses to arguments for the existence of God, especially Dawkins' and Dennett's.

Criticism from David Bentley Hart
Atheist Delusions: The Christian Revolution and Its Fashionable Enemies by David Bentley Hart was  published by Yale in 2009. Philosopher Anthony Kenny called Hart's book "the most able counsel for the defence in recent years." Writing for Commonweal, poet Michael Robbins described the book as "an unanswerable and frequently hilarious demolition of the shoddy thinking and historical illiteracy of the so-called New Atheists." On May 27, 2011, Hart's book was awarded the Michael Ramsey Prize in Theology by the Archbishop of Canterbury, Rowan Williams. Hart argues positively that Christianity was a progressive factor in human history and the only factor, in fact, "that can be called in the fullest sense a 'revolution.'" In his negative case against New Atheism, Hart argues that the Enlightenment was actually "a reactionary flight back toward a comfortable, but dehumanizing, mental and moral servitude to elemental nature."

Accusations of bigotry
The New Atheist movement has been accused of sexism, especially prominent figures such as Richard Dawkins. In 2014, Sam Harris noted that New Atheism was "to some degree intrinsically male".

Sebastian Milbank of The Critic stated that anti Catholic rhetoric by the New Atheist movement reached its pinnacle in 2010, during Pope Benedict XVI's state visit to Great Britain, where "many mainstream newspapers (especially The Guardian) engaged in more or less naked anti-Catholic rhetoric of a sort that seemed more suited to the eighteenth century than the twenty-first.

Some commentators have accused the New Atheist movement of Islamophobia. Wade Jacoby and Hakan Yavuz assert that "a group of 'new atheists' such as Richard Dawkins, Sam Harris, and Christopher Hitchens" have "invoked Samuel Huntington's 'clash of civilizations' theory to explain the current political contestation" and that this forms part of a trend toward "Islamophobia [...] in the study of Muslim societies". William W. Emilson argues that "the 'new' in the new atheists' writings is not their aggressiveness, nor their extraordinary popularity, nor even their scientific approach to religion, rather it is their attack not only on militant Islamism but also on Islam itself under the cloak of its general critique of religion".

Legacy 
In a January 2019 retrospective article, Steven Poole of The Guardian noted that "For some, New Atheism was never about God at all, but just a topical subgenre of the rightwing backlash against the supposedly suffocating atmosphere of 'political correctness'." In November 2019, Scott Alexander argued that New Atheism did not disappear as a political movement but instead turned to social justice as a new cause to fight for.

In an April 2021 interview, Natalie Wynn, a left-wing YouTuber who runs the channel ContraPoints, opined that "The alt-right, the manosphere, incels, even the so-called SJW Internet and LeftTube all have a genetic ancestor in New Atheism." In a June 2021 retrospective article, Émile P. Torres of Salon claimed that prominent figures in the New Atheist movement had aligned themselves with the far-right.

In a June 2022 retrospective article, Sebastian Milbank of The Critic claimed that "As a movement, New Atheism has fractured and lost its original spirit", that "Much of what New Atheism embodied has now migrated rightwards" and that "Another portion has moved leftwards, embodied by the 'I Fucking Love Science' woke nerd of today."

See also 

 A Brief History of Disbelief – 3-part PBS series (2007)
 Antireligion
 Atheist feminism
 Brights movement
 Conflict thesis
 Critical thinking
 Criticism of religion
 Freedom From Religion Foundation
 Freethought
 History of atheism

 Metaphysical naturalism
 Misotheism
 Materialism
 Parody religion
 Public awareness of science
 Relationship between religion and science
 Secular movement
 Social movement

References 
Informational notes

Citations

External links 
 

 
Antitheism
Atheism
Freethought